Oisín Quinn (born 16 May 1969) is a former Irish Labour Party politician who served as Lord Mayor of Dublin from 2013 to 2014 and a Dublin City Councillor from 2004 to 2014.

Quinn was first elected to Dublin City Council in the 2004 Irish local elections for the Rathmines local electoral area. Quinn was an unsuccessful candidate for Dáil Éireann in the Dún Laoghaire constituency at the 2007 general election. He was re-elected in June 2009 for the Pembroke-Rathmines electoral area, and was elected Lord Mayor of Dublin in 2013.

Quinn has called for the direct election of Dublin's mayor, saying that direct election is a necessity if Dublin wants to compete with other similarly sized cities across Europe.

Quinn was educated at Castleknock College. He studied law at University College Dublin and the London School of Economics, and qualified as a barrister from the King's Inns in 1992. His uncle is the former Labour Party leader Ruairi Quinn. He is the son of a former AIB Director Lochlann Quinn.

He lost his council seat at the 2014 local elections.

References

 

1969 births
Living people
Lord Mayors of Dublin
Alumni of University College Dublin
Alumni of the London School of Economics
Irish barristers
Alumni of King's Inns